The 1974 Colorado gubernatorial election was held on November 5, 1974. Democratic nominee Richard Lamm defeated incumbent Republican John D. Vanderhoof with 53.22% of the vote.

Primary elections
Primary elections were held on September 10, 1974.

Democratic primary

Candidates
Richard Lamm, State Representative from Denver
Thomas T. Farley, State Representative from Pueblo

Results

Republican primary

Candidates
John Vanderhoof, incumbent Governor
Bill Daniels, businessman

Results

General election

Candidates
Major party candidates
Richard Lamm, Democratic
John D. Vanderhoof, Republican 

Other candidates
Earl F. Dodge Jr., Prohibition
Lann Meyers, U.S. Labor

Results

References

1974
Colorado
Gubernatorial